Ninetet (Yoshi's) 1997 Vol. 3 is a live album by composer and saxophonist Anthony Braxton with a ninetet, recorded at the Yoshi's in 1997 and released on the Leo label in 2005 as a double CD.

Reception

The Allmusic review by  François Couture stated "Because of the range of arrangements it offers in a format relatively easy to keep together, the Ninetet is turning into Braxton's ultimate Ghost Trance Music-era group, in the light of these recordings. The (shifting) triple-trio configuration, the quality of the musicianship, and the creativity developed from "Composition No. 207" through "Composition No. 218" will make this series one of the essential documents of GTM. As on the previous night, the most immediate difference between the first and the second pieces is Kevin Norton's role. In "211," he sticks exclusively to marimba and vibraphone, while in "212" he is mostly behind the drum kit. The first piece is the strongest one of the two".

Track listing
All compositions by Anthony Braxton

Disc one
 "Composition N. 211" – 55:30

Disc two
 "Composition N. 212" – 55:35

Personnel
 Anthony Braxton – E♭ alto saxophone, F alto saxophone, soprano saxophone, C melody saxophone, flute, B♭ clarinet, bass clarinet, contrabass clarinet
Brandon Evans – tenor saxophone, C soprano saxophone, sopranino saxophone, bass clarinet, flute
James Fei – soprano saxophone, alto saxophone, bass clarinet
Jackson Moore – alto saxophone, B♭ clarinet
André Vida – tenor saxophone, alto saxophone, soprano saxophone, baritone saxophone
J. D. Parran – soprano saxophone, bass saxophone, flute
Kevin O'Neil – electric guitar
Joe Fonda – bass
Kevin Norton – drums, marimba, percussion

References

Anthony Braxton live albums
2005 live albums
Leo Records live albums